This is a list of people that have appeared on stamps of Sudan since the issue of the first stamps in 1897.

Mahatma Gandhi, Indian anti-colonial nationalist (2019)
John Garang, 1945 - 2005, vice-president of Sudan 2005 and leader Sudan People's Liberation Movement / Army 1983 - 2005. (2008)
 Omar Hassan Ahmad al-Bashir, 7th president of Sudan (2008)
 Mohamed Ahmed Ibn Sayid Abd-Allah, 1844 - 1885, Nubian religious leader and 1st Mahdi (2003)
 Ali Osman Mohammed Taha, Minister of Foreign Affairs 1993 - 1995, Vice-president 1995 - 2011 (2008)
Az-Zubair Mohammed Salih, Sudanese soldier and politician who died in 1998 in an airplane crash; to commemorate him the *Az-Zubair Prize for Innovation and Scientific Excellence was established. (2002)
 Mohammed Dorra, 1988 - 2000, Palestinian child died in cross fire between Israeli and Palestinian security forces. (2002) 
Abdel Rahman el Mahdi, also transliterated as Abd al-Rahman al-Mahdi, 1885 - 1959, religious and political leader (1997)
Mohammed Ali Jinnah, founder of Pakistan (1978)
Hilarion Capucci, Archbishop Melkite Greek Catholic Church and pro-Palestinian activist (1977)
 Abdel Fadil Elmaz, anti-British nationalist involved in the 1924 insurrection (1975)
Ali Abd al Latif, Sudanese nationalist, played a prominent role in the 1924 Khartoum revolt (1975)
Gamal Abdel Nasser, 2nd president of Egypt (1973)
Haile Selassie, emperor of Ethiopia, 1930-1974 (1973)
Gaafar al-Nimeiry, president of Sudan 1969 - 1985 (1970)
Abdullahi el Fadel el Mahdi, politician, member Committee of Sovereignty 1964 - 1965 (1968)
Ahmed Yousif Hashim, 1906 - 1958, nationalistic journalist  (1968)
Mohamed Ahmed el Mardi, 1905 - 1966, a.k.a. Mohammed Ahmed el Mardi, politician, minister of Local Government 1955  (1968)
Mohammed Nur el Din, a.k.a. Muhammad Nur el Din, 1898 - 1964, politician and Minister of Public Works 1955  (1968)
Mubarak Zaroug  a.k.a. Mubarak Zarroug (1917 - 1965), politician in the 1950s, Leader of the House of Representatives in 1955 and Minister of External Affairs in 1956  (1966)
 El Siddiq el Mahdi, 1911 - 1961, religious leader, son of Abd al-Rahman al-Mahdi (1966)
Ahmed al-Gurashi Taha, student killed at the University of Khartoum by riot police in October 1964 (1965)
Tirhaqah a.k.a. Taharqa, pharaoh of Egypt and King of the Kush Kingdom 690 - 664 BC (1961)
Charles George Gordon, a.k.a. Gordon of Khartoum, British army officer and administrator (1935)

See also 
 Postage stamps and postal history of Sudan

References

Sudan
Stamps
Philately of Sudan
Stamps